Godbold's Vegetable Balsam was an English patent medicine concocted by Nathaniel Godbold (d.1799) in 1785, and produced by Godbold and later his sons into the 19th century.

Godbold was originally a gingerbread baker, but his product became one of the best-selling patent medicines of the 18th century for asthma, tuberculosis, scrofula and various other respiratory illnesses. Though profits tailed off after the first ten years, Godbold made a small fortune and purchased a country estate from his profits.

Novel advertising
After his death in 1799, his epitaph at the Church of St. Peter & St. Paul, Godalming was a literal advertisement for the product. The 1911 Encyclopædia Britannica even cited the epitaph in its entirety in its entry for advertising:

Ingredients
An examination of the product around 1808 noted "we do not discover any property that can possibly entitle it to the appellation of a balsam, but the propriety of the term vegetable, we cannot dispute, as vinegar, sugar, and honey are vegetable productions." The product claimed to be produced from forty-two different vegetables, preserved separately in syrups, mixed with other gums and ingredients, and dissolved in double-distilled vinegar with some storax dissolved in spirits of wine and oil of cinnamon. It was then claimed to be bottled and held for three years before use. These elaborate directions would be impossible to ever follow, and scientific observers concluded the product was simply an "oxymel" (a form of mead created from honey and wine vinegar), though at times with some variation in ingredients.

References

External links
 A Treatise on the Nature and Cure of Consumptions by Nathanial Godbold (3rd ed. 1787) (a 58 page pamphlet for the product, via Google books)

Patent medicines